Anthony Perrot (born 3 October 1974) is a French rower. He competed in the men's eight event at the 2004 Summer Olympics.

References

External links
 

1974 births
Living people
French male rowers
Olympic rowers of France
Rowers at the 2004 Summer Olympics
People from Bergerac, Dordogne
Sportspeople from Dordogne